The Men's 50 metre breaststroke competition of the swimming events at the 2015 World Aquatics Championships was held on 4 August with the heats and the semifinals and 5 August with the final.

Records
Prior to the competition, the existing world and championship records were as follows.

The following new records were set during this competition.

Results

Heats
The heats were held at 09:30.

Semifinals
The semifinals were held on 4 August at 17:48.

Semifinal 1

Semifinal 2

Final
The final was held at 18:10.

References

Men's 50 metre breaststroke